Farida Anwar (born 1946) is a British Labour Party politician and councillor for Headington Hill and Northway in Oxford City Council. In 2014, she became Oxfordshire's first city councillor from a Bangladeshi background.

Early life
Anwar was born in the Faridpur District, East Bengal, Pakistan (now Bangladesh). Her late father is former civil servant, Shah Muhammad Israil Haq, who settled in the UK in 1965 and held senior positions in British Civil Service, retired as a Joint Secretary in Bangladesh Civil Service and is directly related to the family of Sheikh Mujibur Rahman. Her late mother is Salema Khatun. Anwar has five brothers and one sister, elder brother is the Vice Chancellor of University of Barisal, another brother is a professor of City University of New York, and the remaining three brothers are in Bangladesh Civil Service.

In 1966, Anwar came to the United Kingdom as a student. She has a BA (Hons) in Politics, Economics and English, a Higher Management Qualification and a Teaching Qualification.

Career
Anwar worked as a civil servant in the Department for Health and Social Security for 19 years. In 1987, she was appointed as a Team Manager of Home Care Section at Social Service Department in London Borough of Camden. In 1991, she was promoted to the position of Commissioner of Housing and Social Care Department.

After working about 40 years in British Civil Service and local government, Anwar took early retirement in 2007 to join the Labour Party. In May 2014, in the Oxford City Council election, Anwar was elected as councillor for Headington Hill and Northway, winning a majority of nearly 300 and becoming Oxfordshire's first city councillor from a Bangladeshi background.

Anwar is an elected committee member for UNISON, an elected member of the Oxfordshire Council for Community Relations, a member of the Thames Valley Police Consultative Committee, a member of the executive committee of  the  former Oxfordshire Council for Community Relations and an honorary secretary of the Oxfordshire Bangladeshi Association. She is one of the founders of Oxford Asian Cultural Centre, a governor of St. Michael CE Primary School in Oxford where she has chaired Community and Preschool Committee and an elected member of London Moorfields Eye Hospital Patients' and Governing Body.

Personal life
Anwar is a practising Muslim, is married to Sayedul Hague and a grandmother of three. Her only daughter, Fahmida, is an Oxford Graduate who works at the University of Oxford in the Postgraduate Research Centre.

Anwar lives in Headley Way, Headington, and has lived in Oxford for about 40 years.

See also
 British Bangladeshi
 List of British Bangladeshis
 List of ethnic minority politicians in the United Kingdom

References

External links
 

1946 births
Living people
Date of birth missing (living people)
Bangladeshi Muslims
British Muslims
Bangladeshi emigrants to England
British people of Bangladeshi descent
Civil servants in the Department of Health and Social Security
Labour Party (UK) councillors
Members of Oxford City Council
Women councillors in England
British politicians of Bangladeshi descent
People from Faridpur District
People from Oxford